Suspicion is a 1918 American silent drama film directed by John M. Stahl and starring Grace Davison, Warren Cook and Mathilde Brundage. It is now presumed to be a lost film.

Cast
 Grace Davison as Madelyn Forrest 
 Warren Cook as Dr. Allen Forrest 
 John Merkyl as Leonard White 
 Mathilde Brundage as Mrs. Pennington 
 Alma Dore as Olive Pennington 
 John O'Keefe as James Burns

References

Bibliography
 Bruce Babington & Charles Barr. The Call of the Heart: John M. Stahl and Hollywood Melodrama. Indiana University Press, 2018.

External links
 

1918 films
1918 drama films
1910s English-language films
American silent feature films
Silent American drama films
American black-and-white films
Films directed by John M. Stahl
1910s American films